The 1984 European Formula Two season was contested over 11 rounds. 13 teams, 32 drivers, 8 chassis and 2 engines competed. Ralt driver Mike Thackwell clinched the championship title.

Drivers and teams

source

Calendar

Notes

Race 11 stopped due to heavy rain and restarted.

Final point standings

Driver

For every race points were awarded: 9 points to the winner, 6 for runner-up, 4 for third place, 3 for fourth place, 2 for fifth place and 1 for sixth place. No additional points were awarded. The best 9 results count. No driver had a point deduction.

Note:

Race 9 Alessandro Nannini and Michel Ferté were disqualified firstly due to underweight, but later re-instated on appeal.

Complete Overview

R10=retired, but classified NC=not classified R=retired NS=did not start NQ=did not qualify

References

European Formula Two
European Formula Two Championship seasons